Admiral Tidd may refer to:

Emmett Hulcy Tidd (1923–2018), U.S. Navy vice admiral
Kurt W. Tidd (born 1956), U.S. Navy admiral
Mark L. Tidd (born 1955), U.S. Navy rear admiral